Anurag Tiwari (born 15 November 1995) is an Indian cricketer who plays for Bengal. He made his first-class debut on 23 November 2015 in the 2015–16 Ranji Trophy. He made his Twenty20 debut on 4 January 2016 in the 2015–16 Syed Mushtaq Ali Trophy.

References

External links
 

1995 births
Living people
Indian cricketers
Bengal cricketers